Watchara Mahawong (born November 28, 1983) is a professional footballer from Thailand.

Honours

Club
PEA
 Thailand Premier League Champions (1) : 2008
Thai Honda FC

Thai Division 1 League Champion; 2016

External links
 Goal.com 
 

1983 births
Living people
Watchara Mahawong
Watchara Mahawong
Association football fullbacks
Watchara Mahawong
Watchara Mahawong
Watchara Mahawong
Watchara Mahawong
Watchara Mahawong
Watchara Mahawong
Watchara Mahawong
Watchara Mahawong
Watchara Mahawong
Watchara Mahawong